Dora F. Olivo was a Democratic former member of the Texas House of Representatives, representing the 27th District from 1997 to 2011, she succeeded Huey McCoulskey.  She was defeated in the 2010 Democratic primary by Ron Reynolds, her fellow attorney.

Olivo was also defeated in a comeback attempt in the 2012 general election in District 85 by the Republican Phil Stephenson, a certified public accountant from Wharton. Stephenson received 28,626 votes (58.3%) to Olivo's 20,435 (41.7%).

Family
Dora is married to her husband Victor Jr., and together they have two children: Victor, III, and Geraldo.

Education
Olivo obtained her Bachelor of Science in education from Texas A&M University, Kingsville. She later received her Master of Science in early childhood education from the University of Houston. In 1981, she received her juris doctor from the University of Houston.

Professional experience
From 1977 to 1992, Olivo was the founder and host of Lo Nuestro Radio Show, KFRD.
Olivo was an attorney
Olivo was a teacher for the Corpus Christi Independent School District and Lamar Consolidated Independent School District.

References

External links
Texas House of Representatives - Dora Olivo official TX House website
Project Vote Smart - Representative Dora Olivo (TX) profile
Follow the Money - Dora Olivo
2006 2004 2002 2000 1998 campaign contributions

Members of the Texas House of Representatives
1943 births
Living people
Women state legislators in Texas
University of Houston alumni
University of Houston Law Center alumni
Texas lawyers
21st-century American politicians
21st-century American women politicians